Arete Kosmidou is a Greek singer. She participated in the television show "The Voice of Greece" in 2014, finishing as a runner-up.

Biography
Originating from Alexandroupoli, she auditioned for The Voice of Greece at the age of sixteen. Appearing on the eighth of the eight blind auditions, she auditioned with "Let Her Go", originally by Passenger—with two coaches: Michalis Kouinelis and Despina Vandi electing for her to join their teams; from which Kosmidou selected Michalis Kouinelis. During the battles, Kosmidou sung "I Was Made for Lovin' You" against Christina Miliou–with Michalis crowning her as the winner. In the second live show, she performed "Big in Japan" and was saved by the public. In the third live show, she performed "Little Talks" and was saved by the public along with Uri Melikov. In the fourth live show, she performed "Royals" and was for the first time in the bottom two along with Panayiotis Vintzilaios–with Michalis selecting her to proceed to the semi-final. In the semi-final, she performed "This Is the Life" for her solo performance and "Poison" for her duet with the band Melisses. Kosmidou proceeded to the final after getting 53 points from her coach and 57 points from the public. Her song "So Cruel" was available on iTunes the day after the semi-final, on May 3, 2014. In the final she performed her original song "So Cruel" and a duet with her coach with the song "Prin Se Gnoriso". As she advanced to the second round along with Kiriakou and Kintatos, she performed "Let Her Go", the song she performed during the blind auditions. Kosmidou finished as joint runner-up with Kintatos.

During her appearance in the show, Kosmidou received a proposition from Sakis Rouvas to appear with him in his upcoming concert in Athens. However, she had to turn down the proposition as according to the rules of the show the contestants could not appear in any other concerts.

References

Living people
21st-century Greek women singers
People from Alexandroupolis
Year of birth missing (living people)